Kato Panta (el: Κάτω Πάντα) is one of the two regions of Othoni island, near Corfu, Greece. It includes the central and eastern villages of the island (Ammos, Mastoratika, Kasimatika etc.) while Ano Panta (el: Άνω Πάντα) covers the western part of Othoni.

References

Administrative regions of Greece
Geography of Greece